Fighting Methodists was an early team name of several universities and colleges associated with the United Methodist Church.  It may refer to teams now known as:

 Northwestern Wildcats
 USC Trojans